The Interprovincial Lottery Corporation (ILC) is a Canadian organization that operates lottery games. It is owned jointly by the five provincial lottery commissions. ILC's headquarters are located in Toronto, Ontario.

The ILC was established by the provincial lottery organizations in 1976 to operate joint lottery games across Canada. Today it administers three regular games, Lotto 6/49, Lotto Max and Daily Grand. The ILC used to administer Lotto Super 7 and Millionaire Life.

Each provincial organization is responsible for marketing the national games within its own jurisdiction, and revenues are returned to each province in proportion to generated sales.

Member organizations
 Atlantic Lottery Corporation - serves Newfoundland and Labrador, Nova Scotia, Prince Edward Island and New Brunswick.
 British Columbia Lottery Corporation
 Ontario Lottery and Gaming Corporation
 Loto-Québec
 Western Canada Lottery Corporation - serves Manitoba, Saskatchewan, Alberta, Nunavut, Northwest Territories, and Yukon.

Games administered
 Lotto 6/49
 Lotto Max
Daily Grand

Former games
Lotto Super 7
Millionnaire Life

External links
ILC Media Site (Members Only)

1976 establishments in Ontario
Lotteries in Canada
Government-owned companies of Canada
Organizations based in Toronto